2013 Hockey India League Players' Auction was the auction of players for the first season of the franchise-based field hockey tournament, Hockey India League. Auction was conducted by International Auctioneer Bob Hayton and took place on 16 December at The Lalit Hotel in New Delhi.

A total of 246 players were available for the auction out of which 93 were foreign player and 153 local. Each franchise had a purse of  650,000 to spend in the auction on 24 players (14 Indian and 10 overseas) for a term of 3 years. Minimum base price for an Indian player was  2,800 and for overseas player was  5,000 under which franchise owners could not bid.

Marquee players

The franchise owners made silent bids for each of the five marquee players before the actual auction begun. Hockey India then revealed which marquee player will lead which franchise based on the maximum bids by all the owners. Each team's marquee player got a contract worth at least 115 per cent of the highest successful bid for a player of that team in the auction if the silent bid is not worth more than this amount.

115% 115% of the top paid player of the team
Sandeep Singh was bought by Mumbai Magicians at his base price ($27,800) but Mumbai bought Australian Joel Carroll for $56,000 which raises Sandeep's annual purse to $64,400 due to the 115% rule. Similarly, Jamie Dwyer will fetch $78,200 (115% of Jaap Stockmann with $68,000) and Moritz Fürste will earn $83,950 (115% of Ashley Jackson's $73,000). Dutchman Teun de Nooijer's annual purse is the highest of the league i.e. $87,400 (115% of V.R. Raghunath's winning bid of $76,000) whereas Sardar Singh's annual purse is the highest among Indian players ($78,000).

Auction
Each round of main auction involved bidding for 10 defenders, 10 forwards and 10 midfielders. 25 goalkeepers were auctioned all together in the first round.

 Player replaced.

2nd round
After the main auction, the teams who had not completed their quota of 24 players (14 Indians and 10 overseas) could bid for the unsold players in the main auction.

Replacement signings
Franchises can sign players after the HIL auction, as replacement of contracted players who are not available to play due to injuries and national commitments. Under HIL rules, the replacements have to be chosen from the pool of players who went unsold in the auction.

Unsold players
Following unsold players were added to the reserve pool (according to their base price):

$25,000
  Oliver Korn
  Muhammad Imran
  Ramón Alegre
  Pol Amat
$20,000
  Phil Burrows
$18,000
  Nathan Burgers
$15,000
  Juan Manuel Vivaldi
  Tristan Clemons
  Francois Scheefer
  Muhammad Razie
  Tengku Ahmad Tajuddin
  Hugo Inglis
  Shea McAleese
  Abdul Haseem Khan
  Muhammad Waqas
  Mirosław Juszczak
  Clinton Panther
  Erasmus Pieterse
  Lloyd Madsen
  Xavier Trench
$10,000
  Azlan Misron
  Hamish McGregor
  Imran Shah
  Muhammad Umar Bhutta
  Michal Nowakowski
  Miguel Da Graca
  Rhett Halkett
  Thornton McDade
$5,600
  Mucketira Gannapathy Poonacha
$5,000
  Pedro Budeisky
  Tomas Kuhl
  Benjamin Read
  Ali Shan
  Oriol Fabregas
  Lewis Jon Valentine Prosser

$2,800
  Anjum Tarik
  Dinesh Mann
  K. Laldintluanga
  Kalu Ram
  Keerthi Mallesh Gowda
  Nanak Singh
  Naveen Kumar
  Phirembam Bisham Singh
  R. Aravindan
  Shamsher Singh Kullar
  Subodh Tirkey
  Tariq Mohammad
  Tharun Thamanna Kalmadanda
  Abhijith B.
  Balin Boro
  Gaurav Chandrasen Bhonsle
  Birsu Bhengra
  Kabir Sharma
  R. Ashok Kumar
  Nadeem Uddin
  Mohan Muthanna Bollachanda
  Amit Kumar Malik
  Avtar Singh Mann
  Baljit Singh
  Captain Singh
  Deepak Aasanbhai Ramvani
  Dilbag Singh
  Suresh Kumar Ganeshan
  Gurpreet Singh Randhawa
  Jaskaran Singh
  Naocha Singh Konjengbam
  Laishram Laiba Loko
  Manish Bishnoi
  Prashant
  S. Paulsesu
  Saroj Barla
  Ramesh Setti
  Lowrance
  Kanchan Lochan Rajbhar
  Jatinder Singh
  Ratul Ansary
  Anil Xaxa
  S. Arumugam

$2,800
  Prakash Singh Rawat
  K.D. Bidappa
  Dattesh Tulsidas Priolkar
  Deepak Kishor Ekka
  Harsahib Singh
  Keisham Hera
  Kiran Kumar Thockchom
  Joychandra Singh Lisham
  Lovepreet Singh Momi
  Manjinder Singh
  Manoj Singh Rawat
  Mohammed Riyazuddin
  Mikhail Barla
  Mohammed Iqbal Irshad Mirza
  Mohit Singh Thakur
  Muhammed Murthala P.K.
  Munish Rana
  N. Kamala Kannan
  Nitin Kumar Nandanoori
  Narad Dhaniram Bahadur
  Naveen Antil
  Ningombam Abung
  Dhamu Parthasarthy
  Pawan Singh Chauhan
  Prabhjot Singh
  Ravendra Shiv Kumar
  Rituraj Boro
  Sandeep Raju Sammeta
  Sanjeet Singh Chauhan
  Sarvjeet Singh Bhalru
  Sikander Pal Singh
  Vijay Indra Singh Thapa
  Vijay Thapa
  Vikas Choudhary
  Vinit Kamble

References

auction
auction 2013